Kyle Cranston (born 3 September 1992) is an Australian athlete competing in the combined events. He won the gold medal at the 2017 Summer Universiade. In addition, he competed at the 2018 Commonwealth Games in Gold Coast finishing fifth.

His father Rod Cranston was a runner.

International competitions

Personal bests
Outdoor
100 metres – 10.96 (+1.7 m/s, Gold Coast 2018)
200 metres – 23.72 (+1.8 m/s, Canberra 2010)
400 metres – 48.99 (Taipei 2017)
1500 metres – 4:31.91 (Gold Coast 2018)
110 metres hurdles – 14.74 (+0.2 m/s, Sydney 2016)
High jump – 1.99 (Canberra 2017)
Pole vault – 4.60 (Brisbane 2015)
Long jump – 7.26 (+0.6 m/s, Gold Coast 2018)
Shot put – 13.76 (Taipei 2017)
Discus throw – 45.96 (Sydney 2016)
Javelin throw – 62.36 (Gold Coast 2018)
Decathlon – 7786 (Gold Coast 2018)

References

External links 
 
 Kyle Cranston at Athletics Australia
 Kyle Cranston at Australian Athletics Historical Results
 

1992 births
Living people
Australian decathletes
People from Goulburn
Athletes (track and field) at the 2018 Commonwealth Games
Commonwealth Games competitors for Australia
Universiade medalists in athletics (track and field)
Universiade gold medalists for Australia
Medalists at the 2017 Summer Universiade
Sportsmen from New South Wales